Balinsasayao or Balinsasayaw may refer to:

Lake Balinsasayao in Negros Oriental, Philippines
Balinsasayao Twin Lakes Natural Park in Negros Oriental, Philippines
Kuapnit Balinsasayao National Park in Leyte, Philippines
Swiftlets, family of birds